The Bride of Peladon is a Big Finish Productions audio drama based on the long-running British science fiction television series Doctor Who.

Plot
On the planet of Peladon the young King awaits his bride, a princess from Earth, whom he has never met. The marriage has been arranged for political reasons but the King's grandmother does not approve. With different off-worlders arriving, mysterious deaths happening and a voice manipulating events, it's up to the Doctor and his companions to prevent an ancient evil from rising.

Cast
The Doctor — Peter Davison
Peri — Nicola Bryant
Erimem — Caroline Morris
Beldonia — Phyllida Law
Voice — Jenny Agutter
Pelleas — Christian Coulson
Pandora — Yasmin Bannerman
Zixlyr — Nicholas Briggs
Alpha Centauri — Jane Goddard
Frankis — Richard Earl
Elkin — Peter Sowerbutts
Foreman — Philip Childs
Miner — Thomas Brodie-Sangster

Continuity
This audio drama is a sequel to the Third Doctor serials The Curse of Peladon and The Monster of Peladon. Besides the Doctor, Alpha Centauri is the only other character to appear in all three stories.
This is the fourth Big Finish audio drama to feature the Ice Warriors, following Red Dawn, Frozen Time  and a brief cameo appearance in Bang-Bang-a-Boom!.
The Osirans were introduced in the Fourth Doctor television story Pyramids of Mars.
Yasmin Bannerman appeared in the Ninth Doctor television episode "The End of the World", as Jabe.
Thomas Brodie-Sangster has appeared in the Tenth Doctor television episodes "Human Nature" and "The Family of Blood" as well as another Fifth Doctor audio, The Mind's Eye.
Phyllida Law played Bea Nelson-Stanley in The Sarah Jane Adventures story Eye of the Gorgon.
This is Erimem's departure story.
At the end of the play, Peri says to the Doctor that she will not be leaving (like Erimem) because she marries "some alien king". However, she does in fact end up marrying "some alien king" at the end of The Trial of a Time Lord.

External links
Big Finish Productions – The Bride of Peladon

2007 audio plays
Fifth Doctor audio plays
Fiction set in the 5th millennium